Barry Onouye is a structural engineer, emeritus faculty member in the Department of Architecture at the University of Washington, and author of multiple textbooks on structural engineering and design.

Onouye was born and raised in Hawaii.  He received his B.S. in civil engineering from the University of Hawaii in 1967 and his M.S.E. in structural engineering from the University of Washington in 1969.  Onouye served as a teaching assistant in the Department of Architecture in 1967, and as a part-time lecturer in the Department in 1968.  He began teaching structures in the Department of Architecture as a lecturer on a full-time basis in 1969.  He became a Senior Lecturer about 1990 and retired about 2009.

In 1980 Onouye received the University of Washington Distinguished Teaching Award.   He received the College of Built Environments Lionel Pries Teaching Award in 1989, and the University of Washington Graduate School's Innovative Teaching Fund Award in 1974.  The Sigma Lambda Chi Building Construction Honor Society gave Onouye its Outstanding Educator Award in 1973.

Onouye is a registered professional engineer and has maintained an engineering practice since 1972.  Early in his career he participated in a National Science Foundation project addressing seismic requirements in small town building codes.

Onouye is co-author, with Kevin Kane, of Statics and Strengths of Materials for Architecture and Building Construction, 3rd ed. (Prentice Hall, 2006), author of Statics and Strength of Materials: Foundations for Structural Design (Prentice Hall 2005), and co-author with Douglas Zuberbuhler and Francis D. K. Ching of Building Structures Illustrated: Patterns, Systems, and Design (John Wiley & Sons, 2009).

References

External links 
 University of Washington Department of Architecture

American architecture writers
American male non-fiction writers
University of Hawaiʻi at Mānoa alumni
University of Washington College of Engineering alumni
University of Washington faculty
Writers from Washington (state)
Living people
American textbook writers
21st-century American architects
American structural engineers
Writers from Hawaii
Year of birth missing (living people)